Pietro Benvenuti (8 January 1769 – 3 February 1844) was an Italian neoclassical painter.

Biography
Born in Arezzo in Tuscany, he was influenced by the style of Jacques-Louis David. He was a student of the Academy of Fine Arts of Florence, then studied in Rome, 1792–1803, where he formed an informal academy with his friend of long standing, Vincenzo Cammuccini, and Luigi Sabatelli. He returned to practice in Arezzo.

With a group of collaborators and students Benvenuti was commissioned in 1811–12 to decorate the new rooms in Palazzo Pitti, where he painted a series of mythologic scenes for the Salon of Hercules on the Greek demigod. Another prestigious commission, from the restored Grand Duke of Tuscany, Leopold II, was to fresco the dome of the Capella Medicea at the San Lorenzo, depicting eight grand subjects, taken from the Old and the New Testament, the four Prophets and the four Evangelists. Under his guidance, Carlo Lasinio engraved the Luca Giordano frescoes in Palazzo Medici-Riccardi.

He was an associate of the Accademia di Brera, Milan. In 1829, he was elected into the National Academy of Design as an Honorary member.

In 1807 he was recruited to become court painter to Elisa Bonaparte Baciocchi and to direct the Florentine Academy of Fine Arts. He died at Florence, while holding the post of Director. In that position, he had many pupils and students, including Giuseppe Bezzuoli, Gaspero Martellini, Tomasso Gazzarini, Niccola Cianfanelli, Luigi Mussini, and Giorgio Berti.

He should not be confused with the 16th-century architect Pietro Benvenuto degli Ordini.

Gallery

References

External links

Athena, Hercules and Cupid by Pietro Benvenuti, in Palazzo Pitti, Florence
Toscana Europa: Pietro Benvenuti

1769 births
1844 deaths
18th-century Italian people
19th-century Italian people
18th-century Italian painters
Italian male painters
19th-century Italian painters
Painters from Tuscany
People from Arezzo
Court painters
Italian neoclassical painters
Accademia di Belle Arti di Firenze alumni
Academic staff of the Accademia di Belle Arti di Firenze
19th-century Italian male artists
18th-century Italian male artists